Ahmed Ouattara (born 15 December 1969) is an Ivorian former footballer who played as a striker. He competed professionally, other than in his country, in Switzerland, Portugal, Spain and the United Arab Emirates.

Club career
Born in Abidjan, Ouattara started his career with Africa Sports National, remaining five years with the club after which he signed for FC Sion in Switzerland. He scored a career-best 17 goals in 30 games in the 1997–98 season, but his team could only rank seventh out of 12 in the Swiss Super League. After a loan period by Sporting CP he returned to Switzerland.

Ouattara joined Basel's first team for their 1998–99 season under head coach Guy Mathez. Ouattara played his domestic league debut for his new club in the away game in the Charmilles Stadium on 1 August 1998 as Basel were defeated 0–3 by Servette. He scored his first goal for his club on 15 August in the home game in the St. Jakob Stadium against Xamax as Basel won 2–0. The goal was scored from the penalty point. During the winter break of that season, Ouattara moved to Spain. During his short time with the club he played a total of 18 games for Basel scoring a total of three goals. 17 of these games were in the Nationalliga A and the other was a friendly game. He scored all three goals in the domestic league. 

During 13 years as a professional he also played for CF Extremadura, Al Shabab Al Arabi Club, S.C. Salgueiros and ASEC Mimosas.

Ouattara appeared at the Europe XI v Africa XI friendly game in 1997.

International career
Ouattara was a member of the Ivorian national side between 1989 and 1999. He scored four goals in 21 caps, which included three FIFA World Cup qualification games. He was part of the Africa Cup of Nations squads in 1994 and 1998.

Honours

Player
FC Sion
Swiss Championship: 1996–97
Swiss Cup: 1994–95, 1996–97

References

External links
 
 

1969 births
Living people
Footballers from Abidjan
Ivorian footballers
Association football forwards
Africa Sports d'Abidjan players
ASEC Mimosas players
Swiss Super League players
FC Sion players
FC Basel players
Primeira Liga players
Sporting CP footballers
S.C. Salgueiros players
La Liga players
CF Extremadura footballers
Ivory Coast international footballers
1994 African Cup of Nations players
1998 African Cup of Nations players
Ivorian expatriate footballers
Expatriate footballers in Switzerland
Expatriate footballers in Portugal
Expatriate footballers in Spain
Expatriate footballers in the United Arab Emirates
Ivorian expatriate sportspeople in Switzerland